Web Single Sign-On Metadata Exchange Protocol is a Web Services and Federated identity specification, published by Microsoft and Sun Microsystems that defines mechanisms for a service to query an identity provider for metadata concerning
the protocol suites it supports.  The goal of this operation is to increase the ability of a given service to interoperate with a given identity provider.

External links
 Web Single Sign-On Metadata Exchange Protocol

See also
List of Web service specifications
Web Single Sign-On Interoperability Profile
SAML
XACML
OpenID
WS-Federation

References

Security